Roman Tudoreanu (born March 4, 1987) is a professional tennis player from Moldova and member of the Moldova Davis Cup team. On May 24, 2010, he reached his highest ATP singles ranking of 702. His highest doubles ranking was 803 on August 23, 2010.

Davis Cup

Singles performances (3–2)

Doubles performances (2–3)

References

External links
 
 
 

Living people
1987 births
Moldovan male tennis players
21st-century Moldovan people